Orville Wyss (September 10, 1912, Medford, Wisconsin – November 11, 1993, Brush, Colorado) was an American microbiologist. He was the president of the American Society for Microbiology in 1965.

Biography
Wyss graduated from the University of Wisconsin–Madison with a B.S. in 1937, an M.S. in 1938, and a Ph.D. in 1941. His Ph.D. thesis is entitled The mechanism of biological nitrogen fixation: comparison of the symbiotic and non-symbiotic systems. From 1941 to 1945 he was a research bacteriologist employed by Wallace & Tiernan Products, Inc. In the department of microbiology of the University of Texas at Austin, he was an associate professor from 1945 to 1948 and a full professor from 1948 to 1983, when he retired as professor emeritus. He chaired the department from 1959 to 1969 and again from 1975 to 1976. He supervised the doctoral dissertations of about 70 graduate students, 10 of whom eventually chaired their own microbiology departments.

During his employment by the Wallace & Tiernan Company, he was instrumental in the development of Desenex. He did research on bacterial nitrogen fixation and the physiology and genetics of bacteria. From 1962 to 1963 he worked at McMurdo Station as a biologist for the United States Antarctic Research Program.

Wyss was elected in 1953 a Fellow of the American Association for the Advancement of Science.  In 1967 the United States Board of Geographic Names named Mount Wyss in his honor. He was a Fulbright fellow in 1971 in Australia and in 1978 in Nepal.

In 1941 he married Margaret Bess Bedell. They had three daughters.

Selected publications

Articles
 
 
 
 
 
 
  (reprint of 1951 original)
 
 
 
 
 
 
  (See tris and EDTA.)

Books

References

1912 births
1993 deaths
American microbiologists
University of Wisconsin–Madison alumni
University of Texas at Austin faculty
Fellows of the American Association for the Advancement of Science
People from Medford, Wisconsin